The 1999–2000 Segunda División was the 69th edition since the establishment of the competition.

22 teams participated in the league. The teams that promoted to La Liga were UD Las Palmas, Osasuna and Villarreal CF. The teams that relegated to Segunda División B were CP Mérida, Atlético de Madrid B, CD Logroñés and CD Toledo.

Teams

Teams by Autonomous Community

Final table

Results

Positions by round

References 

Segunda División seasons
2
Spain